Psilocybe keralensis is a species of psilocybin mushroom in the family Hymenogastraceae. It contains the compounds psilocybin and psilocin. Psilocybe keralensis is known only from Kerala, India. It is in the Psilocybe fagicola complex with Psilocybe fagicola, Psilocybe oaxacana, Psilocybe banderillensis, Psilocybe columbiana, Psilocybe herrerae, Psilocybe neoxalapensis, and Psilocybe teofiloi.

See also
List of psilocybin mushrooms
List of Psilocybe species

References

Entheogens
Fungi described in 2002
Psychoactive fungi
keralensis
Psychedelic tryptamine carriers
Fungi of Asia
Fungi of India
Taxa named by Gastón Guzmán